Yuriy Fenin (born 28 March 1977) is a Ukrainian professional football forward who most recently played for various clubs in Estonian lower leagues.

Career
Fenin began his playing career with SC Tavriya Simferopol in the Ukrainian Premier League. He holds a record in Ukraine for being the youngest professional player of the Ukrainian top professional football league when at the age of 15 years and 221 days played for Tavriya Simferopol against FC Zorya-MALS Luhansk.

References

External links
 
 
 

1977 births
Living people
Ukrainian footballers
Association football forwards
Ukrainian expatriate footballers
Expatriate footballers in Moldova
Expatriate footballers in Belarus
Expatriate footballers in Estonia
SC Tavriya Simferopol players
FC Kakhovka players
FC Tiraspol players
FC Rapid Ghidighici players
FC Torpedo Mogilev players
FC Rechitsa-2014 players
FCI Levadia Tallinn players
Maardu Linnameeskond players
Ukrainian Premier League players
Ukrainian Second League players
Sportspeople from Kherson Oblast
Meistriliiga players
Ukrainian expatriate sportspeople in Belarus
Ukrainian expatriate sportspeople in Estonia
Ukrainian expatriate sportspeople in Moldova